Dar al-Bashair is a royal palace located in the Bir al-Azab district of Sana'a, Yemen.

It was the residence of King Muhammad al-Badr. On September 26, 1962, the commander of the royal guard Abdullah al-Sallal staged a coup and had the palace shelled.

See also 
 Dar al-Hajar
 Dar as-Sa'd
 Dar al-Shukr

References 

Buildings and structures in Sanaa
Palaces in Yemen
Yemeni monarchy